Jhon Wilson Murillo Córdoba (born November 6, 1990) is a Colombian footballer who plays as midfielder for Tigres.

Career statistics

References

External links

1990 births
Living people
Colombian footballers
Association football midfielders
América de Cali footballers
Londrina Esporte Clube players
Sportspeople from Antioquia Department